The meridian 1° west of Greenwich is a line of longitude that extends from the North Pole across the Arctic Ocean, the Atlantic Ocean, Europe, Africa, the Southern Ocean, and Antarctica to the South Pole.

The 1st meridian west forms a great circle with the 179th meridian east.

It is the most populous meridian west of Greenwich, being home to between 41.2 million and 44.9 million people as of 2019.

From pole to pole
Starting at the North Pole and heading south to the South Pole, the 1st meridian west passes through:

{| class="wikitable plainrowheaders"
! scope="col" width="125" | Co-ordinates
! scope="col" | Country, territory or sea
! scope="col" | Notes
|-
| style="background:#b0e0e6;" | 
! scope="row" style="background:#b0e0e6;" | Arctic Ocean
| style="background:#b0e0e6;" |
|-
| style="background:#b0e0e6;" | 
! scope="row" style="background:#b0e0e6;" | Atlantic Ocean
| style="background:#b0e0e6;" |
|-
| 
! scope="row" | 
| Scotland — islands of Yell and Hascosay, Shetland
|-
| style="background:#b0e0e6;" | 
! scope="row" style="background:#b0e0e6;" | North Sea
| style="background:#b0e0e6;" |
|-
| 
! scope="row" | 
| Scotland — island of Whalsay, Shetland
|-valign="top"
| style="background:#b0e0e6;" | 
! scope="row" style="background:#b0e0e6;" | North Sea
| style="background:#b0e0e6;" | Passing just east of the Isle of Noss, Scotland,  (at )
|-valign="top"
| 
! scope="row" | 
| England — making landfall just west of Saltburn-by-the-Sea, North Yorkshire
|-valign="top"
| style="background:#b0e0e6;" | 
! scope="row" style="background:#b0e0e6;" | English Channel
| style="background:#b0e0e6;" | Passing just east of the Isle of Wight, England,  (at )
|-
| 
! scope="row" | 
|
|-
| 
! scope="row" | 
| Passing just west of Cartagena, Murcia at 
|-
| style="background:#b0e0e6;" | 
! scope="row" style="background:#b0e0e6;" | Mediterranean Sea
| style="background:#b0e0e6;" |
|-
| 
! scope="row" | 
|
|-
| 
! scope="row" | 
| For about 1 km at the easternmost part of the country
|-
| 
! scope="row" | 
|
|-
| 
! scope="row" | 
|
|-
| 
! scope="row" | 
|
|-
| 
! scope="row" | 
|
|-
| style="background:#b0e0e6;" | 
! scope="row" style="background:#b0e0e6;" | Atlantic Ocean
| style="background:#b0e0e6;" |
|-
| style="background:#b0e0e6;" | 
! scope="row" style="background:#b0e0e6;" | Southern Ocean
| style="background:#b0e0e6;" |
|-
| 
! scope="row" | Antarctica
| Queen Maud Land — claimed by 
|-
|}

See also
Prime meridian
2nd meridian west

References

w001 meridian west